Onesimus (meaning "useful"; died , according to Catholic tradition), also called Onesimus of Byzantium and The Holy Apostle Onesimus in the Eastern Orthodox Church, was probably a slave to Philemon of Colossae, a man of Christian faith. He may also be the same Onesimus named by Ignatius of Antioch (died ) as bishop in Ephesus which would put Onesimus's death closer to 95. If so, Onesimus went from slave to brother to bishop.

In Scripture
The name "Onesimus" appears in two New Testament epistles—in Colossians 4 and in Philemon. In Colossians 4:9 a person of this name is identified as a Christian accompanying Tychicus to visit the Christians in Colossae; nothing else is stated about him in this context. He may well be the freed Onesimus from the Epistle to Philemon.

The Epistle to Philemon was written by Paul the Apostle to Philemon concerning a person believed to be a runaway slave named Onesimus. The traditional designation of Onesimus as a slave is doubted by some modern scholars. Onesimus found his way to the site of Paul's imprisonment (most probably Rome or Caesarea) to escape punishment for a theft of which he was accused. After hearing the Gospel from Paul, Onesimus converted to Christianity. Paul, having earlier converted Philemon to Christianity, sought to reconcile the two by writing the letter to Philemon which today exists in the New Testament. The letter reads (in part):

In tradition
Although it is doubted by authorities such as Joseph Fitzmyer, it may be the case that this Onesimus was the same one consecrated a bishop by the Apostles and who accepted the episcopal throne in Ephesus following Timothy. During the reign of Roman emperor Domitian and the persecution of Trajan, Onesimus was imprisoned in Rome and may have been martyred by stoning (although some sources claim that he was beheaded). However, since the reign of Domitian was from 81 AD to 96 AD, then Onesimus' death would have to fall within these years and not 68 AD as stated above.

In liturgy
Onesimus is regarded as a saint by many Christian denominations. The Lutheran Church–Missouri Synod commemorates him and Philemon on February 15.

Eastern Churches remember Onesimus on 15 February. The traditional Western commemoration of Onesimus is on 16 February. But in the 2004 edition of the Roman Martyrology, Onesimus is listed under 15 February. There, he is described as "[a] runaway slave, whom the apostle Paul received to the faith of Christ while in prison, regarding him as a son of whom he had become father, as he himself wrote to Philemon, Onesimus's master".

See also
 Christianity and slavery, relative to Paul's attitude on slavery
 Onesimus (Bostonian), unrelated to the Bible, arguably the founder of modern inoculation

References

External links
 
 

1st-century Byzantine bishops
1st-century Christian martyrs
1st-century Romans
68 deaths
Christian slaves and freedmen
Christian saints from the New Testament
People in the Pauline epistles
Saints from Roman Anatolia
Year of birth unknown
Bishops of Ephesus
Imperial Roman slaves and freedmen
People from Colossae
Epistle to the Colossians
Epistle to Philemon